Mario Casasús Altamirano (born 16 June 1894, date of death unknown) was a Mexican bobsledder. He competed in the five-man event at the 1928 Winter Olympics.

Notes

References

External links
 

1894 births
Year of death missing
Mexican male bobsledders
Olympic bobsledders of Mexico
Bobsledders at the 1928 Winter Olympics
Sportspeople from Mexico City